Christopher Veitch (13 January 1929 – 18 July 2004) is a South African rower. He competed in the men's coxless four event at the 1952 Summer Olympics.

References

1929 births
2004 deaths
South African male rowers
Olympic rowers of South Africa
Rowers at the 1952 Summer Olympics
Place of birth missing